Marwadi University (MU) is a private university located in Rajkot, Gujarat, India. It was established on 9 May 2016 by the Marwadi Education Foundation through The Gujarat Private Universities (Amendment) Act, 2016. , it offers 54 different courses. It is graded A+ by NAAC.

The university operates under the division of Marwadi Education Foundation's Group of Institutions (MEFGI). MEFGI commenced its operations in the year 2008. It was established as a primary unit of Marwadi Education Foundation under the Bombay Public Trust Act 1950. Marwadi University is aided by the Marwadi Shares and Finance Limited, a major stock broking company in India and Chandarana Intermediaries Brokers Pvt. Ltd. (CIBPL), a well-known firm dealing in technical and arbitrage trading.

Campus

The campus is located on 32 acres of land, having a distance of nearly 40 minutes from railway and airports. The university comprises eight multi-storey buildings. Laboratories, research facilities, student clubs, sports club and college cafeteria are available.

There are two libraries with RFID technologies, 60+ computer systems, 50000+ books. The campus also includes banking and ATM facilities. Around 70+ buses function every day at regular intervals for students and staff. There are hostel rooms with internet facilities, laundry, dance rooms, libraries etc. and capacity to occupy over 2000 students.

Academics

Academic programmes
Marwadi University provides Undergraduate, Postgraduate, Diploma and Doctoral degrees. The university offers all these degrees in different faculties like Engineering, Science, Architecture, Business Management, Computer Applications, Commerce, Law, Pharmacy, Agriculture and Physiotherapy.

Ranking

Faculty of Law, Marwadi University, has been listed as one of the top law schools in India in Forbes India's Legal Powerlist 2020.

Param Shavak

For enhancement of educational infrastructure of the country, Marwadi University has been granted with supercomputer 'Param Shavak' by Gujarat Council on Science and Technology (GUJCOST), Gujarat Government. Param Shavak supercomputing system will aid high-end computations and research work in AI, CE/IT, ICT, ML fields.

Organisation and administration

Faculties

Faculty of Engineering
The faculty offers undergraduate, postgraduate, and diploma degrees.

The undergraduate programmes offered are Bachelors in Computer Engineering, Information Technology, Electrical Engineering, Automobile Engineering, Chemical Engineering, Civil Engineering, Mechanical Engineering, Computer Engineering (Big Data & Analytics), Information and Communication Technology, and Computer Engineering (Artificial Intelligence).

The postgraduate programmes offered are Masters in Chemical Engineering, Cyber Security, Environmental Engineering, Computer Engineering, Geotechnical Engineering, Electric Vehicle, CAD/CAM Engineering, Communication System Engineering, Structural Engineering, Thermal Engineering, Transportation Engineering and VLSI.

The diploma courses offered are Diploma in Computer Engineering, Mechanical Engineering, Chemical Engineering, Electrical Engineering, Civil Engineering, Automobile Engineering and Information and Communication Technology.

Faculty of Science
The faculty offers undergraduate and postgraduate degrees.

The undergraduate programmes offered are Bachelor of Science (B.Sc.) in Chemistry, Microbiology, Physics, Mathematics and Agriculture.

The postgraduate programmes offered are in Master of Science (M.Sc.) in Chemistry Microbiology, Mathematics, Bio-Technology, Physics and Environmental Science.

Faculty of Architecture
The faculty provides Bachelor of Architecture, a 5-year undergraduate programme, which focuses on educating students to develop innovative ideas and skills in the architectural discipline.

Faculty of Business management
The faculty offers undergraduate and postgraduate degrees in business management.

The undergraduate programmes offered are Bachelor of Business Administration, Bachelor of Business Administration (Honors) and Bachelor of Business Administration (Financial Markets).

The postgraduate programmes offered are Master of Business Administration, Master of Business Administration in Business Analytics and Master of Business Administration in Executive Program.

Faculty of Computer Applications
The undergraduate programme offered is Bachelor of Computer Applications. The postgraduate programme offered is Master of Computer Application.

Faculty of Commerce
The faculty offers undergraduate programmes in Bachelor of Commerce and Bachelor of Commerce (Honors).

Faculty of Law
The faculty of law offers undergraduate degrees and postgraduate degrees. The undergraduate programmes offered are BA LLB and B.Com LLB. The postgraduate programme offered is LLM.

Faculty of Pharmacy
The faculty offers a 4-year undergraduate program, Bachelor of Pharmacy, which trains students with in-depth knowledge in pharmaceutical sciences.

Faculty of Physiotherapy
The faculty offers a 3-year undergraduate programme, Bachelor of Physiotherapy.

Faculty of Computer Science
The faculty offers a postgraduate programme in Master of Computer Science in Cyber Security & law.

Centre

Entrepreneurship Development Cell
The university aims to offer youth help to set up their own businesses. To aid this initiative, Marwadi University has developed the Entrepreneurship Development Cell, which has implemented various university-based policies on the campus, such as:
-	Student Startup and Innovation Policy of Government of Gujarat
-	New Generation Innovation And Entrepreneurship Development Centre (NewGen-IEDC)
The cell provides support services to set up businesses by providing them pre-incubation support, guidance for the subsidy, preparation of project reports, registrations, management consultancy and more.

Intellectual Property Rights Cell
To create awareness about intellectual property rights, the university conducts various workshops, seminars, and training courses on IPR.

Energy Swaraj Ashram

Marwadi University declared the inauguration of its solar incubation centre, 'Energy Swaraj Ashram'. The centre was inaugurated by Dr Chetan Singh Solanki, the 'Solar Man of India'. At the solar incubation centre, students will be allowed to conduct advanced research and development, prototyping and analytics in the area of solar energy.

Innovation and Incubation Research (MUIIR) Center

Marwadi University Innovation and Incubation Research (MUIIR) Centre inks strategic MOUs to assist entrepreneurs who are focused on Energy Conservation, AI and Big Data analytics, Sustainable Development and Industry 4.0. 32+ start-ups from engineering, Paramedical, Management and Science are well-supported, and the amount of 50 lakhs + has been raised with the help of MUIIR.

Student life

Clubs
Students clubs at Marwadi University include Aero modeling and Robotics Club, Fitness Club, Team-building Club, Green Club, Computer-Aided Manufacturing Club, Cultural Club, and Music Club.

References

External links 
 

Education in Rajkot
Universities in Gujarat
Educational institutions established in 2016
2016 establishments in Gujarat
Private universities in India